The 2020 All-Ireland Intermediate Ladies' Football Championship was the 23rd contested edition of the Ladies' Gaelic Football Association's secondary inter-county Ladies' Gaelic football tournament.

The impact of the COVID-19 pandemic on Gaelic games forced the delay of the tournament until late in the year.

Meath LGFA were the winners for the first time in their history and were promoted to the All-Ireland Senior Ladies' Football Championship in 2021.

Format

Group stage

13 counties competed in the 2020 tournament. There were three groups of three and one group of four. Each team played the other team's in their group once, earning three points for a win and one for a draw.

Knockout stage

The winners of each group competed in the All-Ireland semi-finals.

Teams

Venues

Fixtures and results

Group 1 Table

Group 1 Results

Group 2 Table

Group 2 Results

Group 3 Table

Group 3 Results

Group 4 Table

Group 4 Results

All-Ireland Semi-Finals

All Ireland Intermediate Final

Awards

TG4 Intermediate Players’ Player of the Year

Vikki Wall  Meath

Intermediate Team of the Championship

Season Statistics

See also

2020 All-Ireland Senior Ladies' Football Championship
2020 All-Ireland Junior Ladies' Football Championship
All-Ireland Intermediate Ladies' Football Championship
Ladies' Gaelic football
Ladies' Gaelic Football Association
Ladies' Gaelic Football All Stars Awards
All-Ireland Senior Ladies' Football Championship
All-Ireland Junior Ladies' Football Championship
Ladies' National Football League

References

2020 in Ladies' Gaelic football
2020 in women's sport
Ladies' All-Ireland Championship
2020 in Irish sport
Ladies' Gaelic football
Women's sport in Ireland
Women's sports competitions in Ireland
Women's team sports